Thieres Pinto de Mesquita Filho (born 27 April 1962 in Santa Quitéria) is a Brazilian businessman and politician affiliated to the Brazilian Labour Party (PTB). He currently is in office of senator of the Republic. In 2014, Thieres was elected 1st Substitute of senator Telmário Mota, elected by the Democratic Labour Party (PDT), for the Federal Senate.

In December 2016, after the discharge of Mota, assumed office as senator.

References

1962 births
Living people
Brazilian Labour Party (current) politicians
Members of the Federal Senate (Brazil)